ACVA may refer to:
 in medicine, Acute Cerebrovascular Accident (stroke)
 Bavarian Auto Group#Al Fotouh Company for Vehicle Assembly
 the official acronym for the Canadian House of Commons Standing Committee on Veterans Affairs
ACV Auctions